Halloween is a single from Matt Pond PA's sixth album Several Arrows Later. It was released in 2005.

Track listing
 "Halloween" (edit) – 3:35
 "Strafford" – 2:41

Personnel
Brian Pearl – guitar, keyboards, bass
Dan Crowell – drums
Daniel Mitha – bass
Matthew Pond – guitar, vocals
Eve Miller – cello
Louie Lino – keyboards, guitars, vocals

Technical Personnel
Produced and Recorded by Louie Lino at Resonate Studios and Digital Arts, NYC and Bearsville Studios, Bearsville, NY
Assisted by Chris Laidlaw
Mixed by John O'Mahoney
Mastered by Andy Vandette for Masterdisk Studios, NYC

References

2005 singles
Matt Pond PA songs
2005 songs
Song articles with missing songwriters